The State Security Service (abbr. СДБ / SDB or РДБ / RDB) or simply State Security (abbr. ДБ / DB), was the security agency within the Ministry of the Interior of the Federal Republic of Yugoslavia tasked with protecting the country from internal threats.

History
It was formed in March 1991 after the dissolution of State Security Administration (UDBA). It was dissolved in July 2002 and replaced with Security Information Agency (BIA) on 1 August 2002.

Special forces
According to the indictment in the series of trials before the International Tribunal for the Former Yugoslavia (ICTY), the Yugoslav Special Forces, also known as Yugoslav Paramilitaries, were secretly established by or with the assistance of the State Security Service. Among those were Serb Volunteer Guard (Arkan's Tigers), Special Operations Unit (Red Berets) and Scorpions.

Officially, the Special Operations Unit (JSO) was incorporated into the State Security Service not before 1996.

Directors
Source: 

 Status

See also

 State Security Administration (UDBA)
 Security Intelligence Agency (BIA)
 Security Administration (FR Yugoslavia)

Notes

References

External links

1991 establishments in Yugoslavia
Government agencies established in 1991
2002 disestablishments in Serbia
Government agencies disestablished in 2002
Yugoslav intelligence agencies